Coastal Christian School (CCS) is a private, non-denominational Christian school in Waldoboro, Maine, United States. It offers classes for grades K-12.

History
Coastal Christian was founded in Waldoboro in 1979. It started out with home-schooling families in a single trailer. It grew and the families purchased a building and expanded to accommodate an influx of students. Eventually, it built a high school wing and is in the process of raising funds and building a gym/theater.

Curriculum
Coastal Christian employs a traditional classroom style of teaching and uses textbooks published primarily by Bob Jones University Press, A Beka, Saxon, and Holt. The teaching is Christian in nature, though the school enrolls students of all faiths. Stanford Achievement Testing is performed annually at all grade levels. A low student/teacher ratio allows for individualized attention. Each student is required to take a Bible class every year, including high school. Attendance at a weekly chapel service is required.

Extra-curricular activities
Extra-curricular activities include the drama club, which puts on an annual play as a fundraiser. Students can also join the yearbook committee, help with pasta suppers, run in fundraising races, or perform in the Christmas performances. CCS operates mission trips to places across the globe, such as Mexico, China and Ecuador.

Athletics
CCS participates in sports throughout the school year. These include soccer, basketball and volleyball. Most sports are played with neighboring schools or other Christian schools across the state. Coastal Christian claimed the soccer championships for their third consecutive year in 2013.

External links
 Coastal Christian School Official Website
 CCS Subsite

Christian schools in Maine
Schools in Lincoln County, Maine
Waldoboro, Maine